Artists' Blood is a 1949 West German comedy film directed by Wolfgang Wehrum and starring Hans Richter, Dorit Kreysler and Fritz Odemar. It was shot at the Wandsbek Studios in Hamburg and on location in mountain resort town of Garmisch-Partenkirchen. The film's sets were designed by the art directors Kurt Herlth and Carl Ludwig Kirmse.

Synopsis
A successful clown wants to marry the daughter of a factory owner, but his prospective father-in-law doesn't want a circus performer in the family and insists that he takes a job at the factor. With a heavy heart he agrees, but then discovering a doppelganger her persuades him to take his place. Confusion soon arises between them.

Cast
 Hans Richter as Clown Antonio & Anton Lammbein
 Dorit Kreysler as Lissy Schilling - Dolmetscherin
 Fritz Odemar as Steffens - Fabrikbesitzer
 Karin Jacobsen as Hannelore - seine Tochter
 Hubert von Meyerinck as Ricardo Pisetti - Manager
 Josef Sieber as Canossa - Garderobier
 Alexis as Liebling - Inspizient
 Petra Unkel as Gesine Pagel
 Luise Franke-Booch as Mutter Lammbein
 Hans Leibelt as Schröder - Portier im 'Continental'
 Carl Voscherau as Portier im 'Hotel Roß'
 Grethe Weiser as Die Vortragskünstlerin
 Walter Giller

References

Bibliography 
 Baer, Hester. Dismantling the Dream Factory: Gender, German Cinema, and the Postwar Quest for a New Film Language. Berghahn Books, 2012.

External links 
 

1949 films
1949 comedy films
German comedy films
West German films
1940s German-language films
Films directed by Wolfgang Wehrum
German black-and-white films
Circus films
1940s German films
Films shot in Bavaria
Films shot at Wandsbek Studios